The Mighty Swordsmen is a 1970 anthology of fantasy short stories in the sword and sorcery subgenre, edited by Hans Stefan Santesson. It was first published in paperback by Lancer Books in December 1970, and was a follow-up to the earlier Lancer anthology The Mighty Barbarians. Robert M. Price edited a later-day homage to both anthologies called The Mighty Warriors (2018).

Summary
The book collects six sword and sorcery tales of authors and protagonists prominent in the genre, featuring Robert E. Howard's Conan, Lin Carter's Thongor, Michael Moorcock's Elric, John Brunner's Traveller in Black, and Roger Zelazny's Dilvish.

Contents
"Keeper of the Emerald Flame" (Thongor) (Lin Carter)
"The Bells of Shoredan" (Dilvish) (Roger Zelazny)
"Break the Door of Hell" (Traveller in Black) (John Brunner)
"The People of the Summit" (Conan) (Björn Nyberg)
"The Flame Bringers" (Elric) (Michael Moorcock)
"Beyond the Black River" (Conan) (Robert E. Howard)

Reception
The book was reviewed by L. Sprague de Camp in Amra v. 2, no. 54, April 1971, and Douglas Menville in Forgotten Fantasy no. 5, June 1971.

Notes

1970 anthologies
Fantasy anthologies
Lancer Books books